Montecorvino Pugliano is a town and comune in the province of Salerno in the Campania region of south-west Italy. The communal seat is in Pugliano; no settlement in the municipality is called "Montecorvino", a toponym related to the nearby commune of Montecorvino Rovella.

Geography
Montecorvino borders with the municipalities of Bellizzi, Giffoni Valle Piana, Montecorvino Rovella and Pontecagnano Faiano.

It includes the frazioni of Pugliano (seat), Bivio Pratole, Pagliarone, Santa Tecla, San Vito and Torello.

Main sights
In south of Santa Tecla, near the road linking the village to Faiano, there are   some ancient Roman thermae with a spring of sulphurous water.

References

External links

Official website

Cities and towns in Campania